The Berkarar Shopping and Entertainment Centre is a modern shopping mall located at 80 Ataturk Street in the Ashgabat, Turkmenistan. Opened on 26 December 2014, Berkarar is the largest shopping mall in Turkmenistan.

History 
The facility was built by the Union of Industrialists and Entrepreneurs of Turkmenistan.

The opening ceremony was held with the participation of President of Turkmenistan Gurbanguly Berdimuhamedov.

References

official site

Shopping malls in Turkmenistan
Shopping malls established in 2014
2014 establishments in Turkmenistan